Harriet Emilie Cady (July 12, 1848 – January 3, 1941) was an American homeopathic physician and author of New Thought spiritual writings. Her 1896 book Lessons in Truth, A Course of Twelve Lessons in Practical Christianity is now considered one of the core texts on Unity Church teachings. It is the most widely read book in that movement. It has sold over 1.6 million copies since its first publication, and has been translated into eleven languages and braille.

Biography 
She was born on July 12, 1848, in Dryden, New York, to Oliver Barlow Cady and Cornelia A. Philips. 
Cady's first job was as a schoolteacher in a one-room schoolhouse in her hometown. In the late 1860s, she decided to pursue the field of medicine, and enrolled in the Homeopathic Medical College of the State of New York 
She graduated in 1871 and became one of the first woman physicians in America.

Spiritual development and writing career
Introduced to the teachings of Albert Benjamin Simpson, Cady became deeply involved in spiritual and metaphysical studies. She was inspired and influenced by Biblical teachings and the philosophy of Ralph Waldo Emerson. She was taught by Emma Curtis Hopkins, the New Thought "teacher of teachers" and a student of Christian Science and Mary Baker Eddy.

Cady associated with several prominent figures in the New Thought movement of the time, including: Emma Curtis Hopkins, Divine Science minister Emmet Fox, Ernest Holmes, founder of Religious Science, and Charles and Myrtle Fillmore, co-founders of Unity Church.  Finding The Christ in Ourselves, a pamphlet she had written and sent unsolicited to Charles and Myrtle Fillmore, was published by them in the October 1891 issue of Thought. Beginning in 1892, a series of articles titled Lessons in Truth by Dr. Cady were published in Unity magazine. This material later was compiled into a book and was the first book Unity published.

Death
Cady died January 3, 1941, in Manhattan, New York City.

Published works
Lessons in Truth, A Course of Twelve Lessons in Practical Christianity. (1894). 
How I Used Truth. (Revised Edition, 1916).  (Formally published as Miscellaneous Writings)
God, A Present Help. (1868). 
The Best Theology.
Source: WorldCat

Notes

References

External links 
The complete book "Lessons In Truth" by H. Emilie Cady
Biographical webpage

1848 births
1941 deaths
19th-century Christian mystics
20th-century Christian mystics
American Christian mystics
American religious writers
American spiritual writers
New Thought mystics
American homeopaths
New Thought clergy
New Thought writers
Writers from Syracuse, New York
Unity Church
People from Dryden, New York
Women religious writers
Religious leaders from Syracuse, New York
American women non-fiction writers